Prison Stories, styled as Prison Stories: A Collection of Short Storie[s], is a collection of prison stories by Nigerian writer Helon Habila. "Love Poem", which is among the stories included in the collection, won the 2001 Caine Prize for African Writing.  It was first published by Epic Books.

Plot summary
The book is a collection of short stories about the brutal life faced by prisoners in prison, mostly by those are innocent.

References 

2000 short story collections
Books about imprisonment
Fiction set in prison
Nigerian short story collections